Krakow am See is a municipality  in the Rostock district, in Mecklenburg-Western Pomerania, Germany.

References

Cities and towns in Mecklenburg
1460s establishments in the Holy Roman Empire
1467 establishments in Europe
Populated places established in the 1460s